Mardy Fish and Mark Knowles were the defending champions; however, Fish chose not to compete.
Mark Knowles teamed up with Xavier Malisse, but they were eliminated by Robert Lindstedt and Horia Tecău.

No. 3 seeds Michaël Llodra and Nenad Zimonjić won the tournament beating Lindstedt & Tecău in the final, 6–7(3–7), 7–6(8–6), [10–7].

Seeds

Draw

Draw

External links
 Main draw

Legg Mason Tennis Classic - Doubles